Lucassie Sandy Nowra (1924 – 1993) was an Inuit artist.

His work is included in the collections of the Musée national des beaux-arts du Québec, the McMichael Canadian Art Collection and the Brooklyn Museum

References

1924 births
1993 deaths
20th-century Canadian artists
Inuit artists